The name Alice has been used for eighteen tropical cyclones worldwide: four in the Atlantic Ocean, ten in the Western Pacific Ocean, one in the South-West Indian Ocean, and three in the Australian region.

In the Atlantic:
 Tropical Storm Alice (1953), made landfall in Honduras, Cuba, and in Florida
 Hurricane Alice (June 1954), formed in the Bay of Campeche and made landfall in northeastern Mexico, just south of the Mexico–United States border.
 Hurricane Alice (December 1954), produced heavy rainfall and moderately strong winds across the northern Leeward Islands; is one of only two known Atlantic tropical cyclones to span two calendar years.
 Hurricane Alice (1973), a Category 1 hurricane which affected Bermuda and Atlantic Canada.

In the Western Pacific:
 Typhoon Alice (1947) (T4716), a Category 4 typhoon that did not approach land
 Typhoon Alice (1953) (T5318), a long-lived Category 3 typhoon which did not affect land; crossed the International Date Line before dissipating
 Super Typhoon Alice (1958) (T5811), a Category 4 typhoon that affected Japan; responsible for over 40 deaths on Hokkaido
 Typhoon Alice (1961) (T6103, 10W), a Category 1 typhoon that formed in the South China Sea before making landfall near Hong Kong, killing four people there
 Typhoon Alice (1964) (T6404, 05W), a short-lived Category 1 typhoon to the east of the Philippines
 Super Typhoon Alice (1966) (T6616, 16W), a Category 4 typhoon that made landfall in eastern China
 Tropical Storm Alice (1969) (T6907, 07W), a tropical storm that affected southern Japan
 Typhoon Alice (1972) (T7213, 13W), a Category 2 typhoon that passed close to Japan's Boso Peninsula
 Typhoon Alice (1975) (T7511, 13W), a Category 1 typhoon that passed over Luzon in the Philippines and the Chinese island of Hainan
 Typhoon Alice (1979) (T7901, 01W), a Category 3 typhoon that caused severe damage in the Marshall Islands

In the South-West Indian:
 Tropical Storm Alice (1973), a long-lived cyclone that passed through the southern Seychelles

In the Australian region:
 Cyclone Alice (1974), stayed well to the east of the coast of New South Wales and Queensland
 Cyclone Alice (1976), formed in the Timor Sea and moved west, stayed over the open ocean
 Cyclone Alice–Adelaide (1980), a Category 3 tropical cyclone that formed near Sumatra and moved out into the open sea; crossed into the South-West Indian Ocean

Atlantic hurricane set index articles
Pacific typhoon set index articles
South-West Indian Ocean cyclone set index articles
Australian region cyclone set index articles